Henry A. Shaw (June 21, 1818January 29, 1891) was a Michigan politician.

Early life 
Shaw was born on June 21, 1818 in Vermont. He began his law career in Ohio. In 1842, due to health concerns, he moved to Eaton County, Michigan.

Military career 
Shaw enlisted in Company B of the Michigan 2nd Cavalry Regiment on October 2, 1861 as a Private. He was promoted to the position of Major on November 12, 1861. He was mustered out on September 3, 1862.

Political career 
Shaw was sworn in as a member of the Michigan House of Representatives in 1857 and served until 1860. During this time, he also served as Speaker of the Michigan House of Representatives from 1859 to 1860. After these terms, he was again sworn into the Michigan House of Representatives from 1873 to 1874.

Death 
Shaw died in Eaton Rapids, Eaton County, Michigan on January 29, 1891.

References 

1818 births
1891 deaths
Speakers of the Michigan House of Representatives
Republican Party members of the Michigan House of Representatives
Union Army officers
People of Michigan in the American Civil War
19th-century American politicians